The Dar es Salaam Marine Reserve System (DMRS) is a group of marine wildlife reserves in Tanzania, situated off the coast of Dar es Salaam Region. The reserve system consists of nine uninhabited islands, four north of Dar es Salaam (Bongoyo, Mbudya, Pangavini and Fungu Yasini) and five south of the city (Inner and Outer Makatumbe, Inner and Outer Sinda and Kendwa Island). It provides protection for several important tropical ecosystems; coral reefs, mangroves and seagrass beds.

Legal status
Management of the reserve is governed by the Tanzanian Board of Trustees of Marine Parks and Reserves which is the custodian and overseer of the establishment and management of the Marine Protected Reserves in Tanzania.

The Dar es Salaam Marine Reserves were first established under the Fisheries Act of 1970 and in 1998 were transferred to the Marine Parks and Reserves  (MPRs), Act No. 29 of 1994. .

Threats
Visits to the reserve area (especially Bongoyo and Mbudya) are a popular daytrip for both tourists and Tanzanian residents alike, the islands serving as a location for a variety of leisure activities, including snorkelling, sunbathing and hiking. However, over recent years unregulated tourist activities has led to degradation within the reserves.

The nearby fishing communities of Kunduchi, Unonio, and Msasani all appear to be heavily dependent on the resources in the reserves  and resource over-exploitation is an increasing concern with local fishermen attributing a decline in fish catches over recent years to the use of small mesh nets and dynamite fishing. A decrease in the abundance of fish and coral health, and an increased amount of bleached and broken coral has been noted by divers.

External links
 Website of Marine Parks and Reserves of Tanzania, very poor on information
 Special report by the Tanzania Marine Parks and Reserves Unit (MRRU, 2012)

Marine reserves of Tanzania
Protected areas established in 1970
Geography of Dar es Salaam
Uninhabited islands of Tanzania
1970 establishments in Tanzania
Tourist attractions in Dar es Salaam
East African coral coast